Frontier Uprising is a 1961 American Western film directed by Edward L. Cahn and starring Jim Davis, Nancy Hadley and Ken Mayer. It is a remake of Kit Carson (1940).

Plot
Not having heard that war has erupted between the U.S. and Mexico, a wagon train heads west, only to find itself threatened by the Mexicans who have teamed up with hostile Indians.

Cast
 Jim Davis as Jim Stockton
 Nancy Hadley as Consuela Montalvo
 Ken Mayer as Beaver McBride
 Nestor Paiva as Don Carlos Montalvo
 Don Kelly as 1st Lt. Kilpatrick (as Don O'Kelly)
 Eugene Iglesias as Lt. Felipe Ruiz (Mexican Army)
 Stuart Randall as Ben Wright
 John Marshall as Gen. Torena 
 David Renard as Lopez 
 Tudor Owen as Charley Bridger
 Renata Vanni as Augustina
 Addison Richards as Cmdr. Kimball
 Herman Rudin as Chief Taztay
 Jan Arvan as Toyon

See also
 List of American films of 1961

References

External links

1961 films
American black-and-white films
Remakes of American films
1961 Western (genre) films
American Western (genre) films
Films directed by Edward L. Cahn
Films produced by Edward Small
United Artists films
1960s English-language films
1960s American films